Rhys Sutherland is a fictional character from the Australian soap opera Home and Away, portrayed by actor Michael Beckley from 2000 to late 2004.

Casting
Beckley spent 20 years as a theatre actor before he joined the cast of Home and Away he told Joanne McCarthy of the Newcastle Herald. "I went to my agent and said, 'I want to do some TV, I want some stability', and I basically fell into Home and Away, and I'm very glad I did." On production, Beckley said "You do try to be a one-take wonder because we don't have a lot of resources. You've got to grab the stuff and make it work, but that's what being a professional is about. I think people would be surprised, but we don't have a lot of out-takes where people fall about laughing. I can think of only one time in four years when that's happened. The rest of the time if you make a mistake you say, 'Oops, sorry', and you do it again and get it right." He described Summer Bay as a "deadly little place" and said "You've really got to watch your step. And, of course, no one does. We've often joked that you'd only survive living in Summer Bay for about three hours if it actually existed."

Storylines
Rhys, his wife  Shelley (Paula Forrest) and their three teenage daughters Dani (Tammin Sursok), Kirsty (Christie Hayes) and Jade (Kate Garven) relocate to Summer Bay after purchasing Summer Bay House and the adjoining Caravan Park from Pippa Ross (Debra Lawrence). Rhys takes over the running of the surf club kiosk. When Shelley brings home Brodie Hanson (Susie Rugg) from the local drop-in centre, Rhys has reservations at first but they foster her.

Rhys is enraged when he learns Dani has been raped by Kane Phillips (Sam Atwell) and this causes friction within the family. Matters are made worse when Kane is found not guilty and Rhys tries to drive him out of town. Kane eventually leaves of his own accord. Rhys' brother, Pete (Christopher Mayer) and his son Max (Sebastian Elmaloglou), arrive for a visit. It soon becomes apparent that Pete is on the run facing gambling debts and he flees leaving Max in Rhys and Shelley's care.

Kirsty's rebellion begins to test Rhy's patience and matters are not helped when she begins seeing Kane, who had saved her and Shelley's lives on a cruise. Rhys forces Kirsty to choose between the family and Kane. Kirsty initially choose's the family but runs away with Kane for a while. Kane eventually dumps Kirsty leaving her to return to the family.

Angie Russell (Laurie Foell), a former flame of Rhys, arrives in the bay for their 40th birthday and causes havoc by alleging that Rhys is the father of her son, Dylan (Brett Hicks-Maitland). This news threatens to tear the Sutherland's apart. It's later revealed to the shock of Angie and the Sutherlands, that Rhys is not Dylan's father but the damage to Rhys and Shelley's marriage is done and Shelley moves to the city, leaving Rhys and the girls Heartbroken. Kane later returns and gets back together with Kirsty provoking Rhys' anger even further. Dani is later jailed for running over Kane and Rhys struggles to forgive Kirsty for siding with Kane over her sister.

Rhys begins a new relationship with Beth Hunter (Clarissa House) and they later become engaged despite the arguments between their respective broods. On Rhys and Beth's wedding day, everybody is present except for Kirsty who has eloped with Kane. After Dani slowly warms to Kane, Rhys drops his hostilities with Kane. After Kirsty is diagnosed with a kidney problem and miscarries, Shelley returns to donate her kidney. The Sutherlands later discover Jade was switched at birth with another baby, Laura DeGroot (also played by Hayes). Shelley and Rhys began to spend a great deal of time together and eventually fall in love again. Rhys breaks Beth's heart and reunites with Shelley in the city and they remarry a year later.

Reception
Sacha Molitorisz of The Sydney Morning Herald said that the episode featuring Rhys and Beth's wedding was better suited to "die hard fans". They criticised the plot for being "unengaging" and opined that the music, performances and dialogue were "painful" and "patchy".

References

External links
 Character profile at the Official AU Home and Away website

Home and Away characters
Television characters introduced in 2000
Male characters in television